Ichinotani-ike is an earthfill dam located in Yamaguchi prefecture in Japan. The dam is used for irrigation. The catchment area of the dam is 0.6 km2. The dam impounds about 1  ha of land when full and can store 60 thousand cubic meters of water. The construction of the dam was started on 1921 and completed in 1954.

References

Dams in Yamaguchi Prefecture
1954 establishments in Japan